Carlos Felipe María Otón Lucas Marcos de Aviano Melchor de Habsburgo-Lorena y Arenberg (born 18 October 1954) or simply known as Archduke Carlos Felipe, is a member of the House of Habsburg-Lorraine. He is the first male of the former ruling house to be born in Mexico.

Academic
Carlos Felipe has studied business administration at the Monterrey Institute of Technology and Higher Education, financial derivatives at the ITAM, Autonomous Technological Institute of Mexico and international relations at The College of Mexico. He has earned as well a master's degree in business administration and finance at the ESADE Business School of Barcelona.

He worked at the AWT Internationale Handels und Finanzierungs A.G., in Vienna, Austria from 1988 to 1990; as a delegate in Vienna, Bonn, and Montreal, for the National Exterior Commerce Bank of Mexico (BANCOMEXT). Since 2000, he has been president of the Habsburg Financial Services, a family office or a wealth management company.

In 2012, Carlos Felipe became a member of the Board of Trustees of the Morelia Music Festival, which he presided till 2018. Carlos Felipe has published different essays and articles in history related publications. He has given many conferences regarding his family’s history as well as the Second Mexican Empire. He speaks fluently several languages such as Spanish, German, French, English and Catalan.
Since 2019 he has been honorary president of the international movement of culture and traditions "Royal Cross - Renewal in Tradition" based in Italy. Official site www.crocereale.it

Family
Carlos Felipe de Habsburgo is the second offspring and eldest son of Archduke Felix of Austria and Princess and Duchess Ana Eugenia of Arenberg. Paternally, he is the grandson of Charles I & IV, Emperor of Austria and King of Hungary and Bohemia, and a great-great-nephew of Emperor Maximilian I of Mexico.

Carlos Felipe was married firstly and civilly to Martina Donath (born 1955, Vienna), in Munich on 4 September 1994 (div. 1997), and secondly to Annie-Claire Lacrambe (born 1959, Pau), in Pau on 12 May 1998 and later at the Seville Cathedral. 

Carlos Felipe has two sons:

 Julian-Lorenz Peter (Spanish: Julián-Lorenzo; born 1994, by his first marriage)
 Louis-Damian Henri Maria Marko d'Aviavo Malchior (Spanish: Luiz-Damián; born 1998, by his second marriage)

References

1954 births
Living people
People from Mexico City